Marlpool railway station was a former railway station at Marlpool in Derbyshire. It was opened on the Heanor branch from Ilkeston on the Great Northern Railway (Great Britain) Derbyshire Extension line.

Opened in 1891, passenger services finished in 1928.

References

 
 
 

Disused railway stations in Derbyshire
Former Great Northern Railway stations
Railway stations in Great Britain opened in 1891
Railway stations in Great Britain closed in 1928